Elgin West was an electoral riding in Ontario, Canada. It was created in 1867 at the time of confederation and was abolished in 1933 before the 1934 election. After the 1875 election, Malcolm Munroe was declared the winner by 10 votes. The runner-up and incumbent Thomas Hodgins, petitioned for a recount and after analysis, he was found to have won by 8 votes. Therefore Hodgins regained his seat. Munroe's tenure was so short that he never served in the legislature.

Members of Provincial Parliament

References

Notes

Citations

Former provincial electoral districts of Ontario